Nationality words link to articles with information on the nation's poetry or literature (for instance, Irish or France).

Events

 August 1 – British Rear-Admiral Horatio Nelson's defeat of the French fleet in the Battle of the Nile is the subject of separate poems this year by English poets William Lisle Bowles and William Sotheby.
 December 20 – William Wordsworth and his sister Dorothy first take up residence at Dove Cottage, Grasmere.
 William Wordsworth completes the first version of The Prelude, begun in 1798. This version, in two parts, describes the growth of his understanding up to age 17, when he leaves home for the University of Cambridge. He will revise the poem more than once during his lifetime but not publish it. Months after his death in 1850 it will be published for the first time in its final version.
 The Monthly Magazine and American Review starts publication in the United States; edited by Charles Brockden Brown, featuring articles on current events and science, poems, short stories, essays and book reviews; converted into American Review and Literary Journal in 1801, when it becomes a quarterly.

Works published in English

United Kingdom
 Mary Alcock, Poems
 William Lisle Bowles, Song of the Battle of the Nile, about Nelson's defeat of the French fleet in the Battle of the Nile on August 1, 1798
 Thomas Campbell, The Pleasures of Hope, with Other Poems
 George Huddesford, published anonymously:
 Bubble and Squeak
 Crumbe Repetita, sequel to Bubble and Squeak
 M. G. Lewis, editor and contributor, Tales of Terror, imitations, translations and other poems; poets included: Walter Scott, Robert Southey, John Leyden (see also Sir Walter Scott, An Apology for Tales of Terror below)
 Sir Walter Scott:
 Translated from the German of Johann von Goethe, Goetz of Berlichingen; with The Iron Hand
 Anonymously published, An Apology for Tales of Terror, also attributed to M. G. Lewis
 William Sotheby, The Battle of the Nile, about Nelson's defeat of the French fleet in the Battle of the Nile on August 1, 1798
 Robert Southey, Poems ... The Second Volume, including the original Book 9 of Joan of Arc ("the Vision of the Maid of Orleans") and new material (see also Poems 1796)
 Jane West
 The Mother: a Poem in Five Books
 Poems and Plays, vols 1 & 2

United States
 Richard Alsop, Lemuel Hopkins and Theodore Dwight, The Political Greenhouse, popular satirical verse with a Federalist attack on Thomas Jefferson, Democratic Republicans, France and Jacobins; first appeared in the Connecticut Courant; quoted in Congress
 Sarah Wentworth Morton, The Virtues of Society, narrative poem about a wounded British officer and his wife; adapted from part of Beacon Hill 1797
 Lindley Murray, editor, The English Reader; or, Pieces in Prose and Poetry Selected from the Best Writers, fiction, nonfiction and poetry

Works published in other languages
 Tomás António Gonzaga, Marília de Dirceu, second part, Brazil in Portuguese
 Évariste-Désiré Parny, La Guerre des dieux, anti-Christian mock epic; France

Births
Death years link to the corresponding "[year] in poetry" article:
 March 12 – Mary Howitt, née "Botham" (died 1888) English poet, author of The Spider and the Fly
 April 17 – Eliza Acton (died 1859), English poet and cook
 May 11 – Robert Charles Sands (died 1832), American writer and poet
 May 23 – Thomas Hood (died 1845), English humorist and poet; father of playwright and editor Tom Hood
 June 6 – Alexander Pushkin (died 1837), Russian poet
 July 5 – John Abraham Heraud (died 1887), English epic poet
 October 9 – Louisa Stuart Costello (died 1870), English miniature-painter, poet, historical novelist and travel writer
 Also:
 George Pirie (died 1870), Scottish-born Canadian newspaper publisher and poet
 Gu Taiqing (died 1876), Chinese poet during the Qing Dynasty (a woman)
 Sukey Vickery (died 1821), American novelist and poet (a woman)

Deaths
Death years link to the corresponding "[year] in poetry" article:
 February 24 – Georg Christoph Lichtenberg (born 1742), German writer, poet, mathematician and the first German professor of experimental physics
 August 15 – Giuseppe Parini (born 1729), Italian satirist and poet
 William Cliffton (born 1772), American
 Johann Christoph Krauseneck (born 1738), German

See also

 Poetry
 List of years in poetry
 List of years in literature
 18th century in literature
 18th century in poetry
 Romantic poetry

Notes

18th-century poetry
Poetry